Cameron Robert McGilp (born 8 February 1998) is a Scottish born Australian footballer who plays for Australian National Premier Leagues Victoria side Dandenong Thunder, where he plays as a midfielder.

Playing career

Melbourne Victory
On 19 September 2017, McGilp signed a professional contract with Melbourne Victory.

On 15 May 2018, McGilp was released by Melbourne Victory along with three of his teammates.

Swindon Town
After a brief spell with Birmingham City, he moved to Swindon Town in January 2019. After his progress was interrupted by injury, he made his English Football League debut as a 72nd-minute substitute in the last match of the season.
On 9 October 2020 McGilp left Swindon Town by mutual consent.

Hungerford Town (loan)
In October 2019, McGilp joined National League South club Hungerford Town on loan.

Slough Town (loan)
On 10 October 2020, McGilp joined National League South club Slough Town

Gloucester City
On 12 February 2021, McGilp signed for National League North side Gloucester City.

References

External links

1998 births
Living people
Association football midfielders
Australian soccer players
Melbourne Victory FC players
Birmingham City F.C. players
Swindon Town F.C. players
Hungerford Town F.C. players
Slough Town F.C. players
Gloucester City A.F.C. players
National Premier Leagues players
A-League Men players
English Football League players
National League (English football) players
Australian expatriate soccer players
Australian expatriate sportspeople in England
Expatriate footballers in England